Nowe Wiechy  is a settlement in the administrative district of Gmina Kulesze Kościelne, within Wysokie Mazowieckie County, Podlaskie Voivodeship, in north-eastern Poland.

Notes

Nowe Wiechy